İneş is a rural locality (a posyolok) in Biektaw District, Tatarstan. The population was 486 as of 2010.

Geography 
İneş is located 1,5 km southeast of Biektaw, district's administrative centre, and 27 km northeast of Qazan, republic's capital, by road.

History 
The village was established in 1997.

Since its establishment is a part of Biektaw district.

References

External links 
 

Rural localities in Vysokogorsky District